Matthew Henry Robson (1887 – after 1919) was an English professional footballer who made 121 appearances in the Football League playing for Lincoln City. He played as a wing half.

Robson was born in Eighton Banks, Gateshead, which was then in County Durham. He began his football career with Washington United and Wallsend Park Villa in his native north-east of England, before joining Football League Second Division club Lincoln City. He made his debut in a goalless draw at home to Grimsby Town in September 1909, and remained with the club until the First World War interrupted competitive football. After the war, he played for Scunthorpe & Lindsey United and Boston Town.

Notes

References

1887 births
Year of death missing
Footballers from Gateshead
English footballers
Association football wing halves
Washington United F.C. players
Lincoln City F.C. players
Scunthorpe United F.C. players
Boston Town F.C. (1920s) players
English Football League players
Date of birth missing
Place of death missing